Declared in June 2014, the West and Central African cholera outbreak as of January 25, 2015 claimed 1,683 registered deaths and over 91,361 reported cases with a reported case fatality rate (CFR) of 2% in 11 countries, which is 3 times more than in 2013. The case fatality ratio is high in the Sahelian area, equal or greater than 2%, especially in Nigeria, Chad, Cameroon and Niger.  Nigeria, Ghana and Democratic Republic of the Congo being the most affected countries with Ghana reporting its worst outbreak since 1982.

In January 2015 the Greater Accra Region and Volta region still reported cases of Cholera while in the rest of Ghana the outbreak was declared over. As of January 11 the Democratic Republic of the Congo, Ghana and Nigeria are the countries with highest number of new cases of the disease in 2015.

References

Cholera outbreaks
Disease outbreaks in Ghana
2014 in Africa
2015 in Africa
2014 in Ghana
2015 in Ghana
2014 disease outbreaks
2015 disease outbreaks